The 2018 Mutua Madrid Open was a professional tennis tournament played on outdoor clay courts at the Park Manzanares in Madrid, Spain from 5–13 May 2018. It was the 17th edition of the event on the ATP World Tour and 10th on the WTA Tour. It was classified as an ATP World Tour Masters 1000 event on the 2018 ATP World Tour and a Premier Mandatory event on the 2018 WTA Tour.

Points and prize money

Point distribution

Prize money

ATP singles main-draw entrants

Seeds
The following are the seeded players. Seedings are based on ATP rankings as of 30 April 2018. Rankings and points before are as of 7 May 2018.

† The player did not qualify for the tournament in 2017. Accordingly, points for his 18th best result are deducted instead.
‡ The player used an exemption to skip the tournament in 2017. Accordingly, points for his 18th best result are deducted instead.

Withdrawals
The following players would have been seeded, but they withdrew from the event.

Other entrants
The following players received wildcards into the main draw:
  Pablo Andújar 
  Roberto Carballés Baena 
  Guillermo García López 
  Stefanos Tsitsipas

The following players received entry from the qualifying draw:
  Nikoloz Basilashvili
  Marius Copil 
  Federico Delbonis 
  Evgeny Donskoy 
  Nicolás Kicker 
  Mikhail Kukushkin
  Dušan Lajović

Withdrawals
Before the tournament
  Marin Čilić → replaced by  Julien Benneteau
  Roger Federer → replaced by  Denis Shapovalov
  David Ferrer → replaced by  Jan-Lennard Struff
  Filip Krajinović → replaced by  Daniil Medvedev
  Nick Kyrgios → replaced by  Mischa Zverev
  Gilles Müller → replaced by  Paolo Lorenzi
  Andy Murray → replaced by  Benoît Paire
  Sam Querrey → replaced by  Jared Donaldson
  Andrey Rublev → replaced by  Tennys Sandgren
  Jo-Wilfried Tsonga → replaced by  Ryan Harrison
  Stan Wawrinka → replaced by  Peter Gojowczyk

ATP doubles main-draw entrants

Seeds

Rankings are as of April 30, 2018.

Other entrants
The following pairs received wildcards into the doubles main draw:
  David Marrero /  Fernando Verdasco 
  Florin Mergea /  Daniel Nestor

Retirements
  Bob Bryan (hip injury)

WTA singles main-draw entrants

Seeds
The following are the seeded players. Seedings are based on WTA rankings as of 30 April 2018. Rankings and points before are as of 7 May 2018.

† The player did not qualify for the tournament in 2017. Accordingly, points for her 16th best result are deducted instead.
‡ The player did not qualify for the tournament in 2017, but was defending points from an ITF Women's Circuit tournament.

Other entrants
The following players received wildcards into the main draw:
  Lara Arruabarrena 
  Georgina García Pérez 
  Marta Kostyuk
  Monica Puig
  Sara Sorribes Tormo

The following player received entry using a protected ranking:
  Victoria Azarenka

The following players received entry from the qualifying draw:
  Danielle Collins 
  Sara Errani 
  Bernarda Pera 
  Kristýna Plíšková
  Aryna Sabalenka  
  Anna Karolína Schmiedlová
  Sílvia Soler Espinosa 
  Natalia Vikhlyantseva

Withdrawals
Before the tournament
  Timea Bacsinszky → replaced by  Maria Sakkari
  Catherine Bellis → replaced by  Kateřina Siniaková
  Angelique Kerber → replaced by  Donna Vekić
  Agnieszka Radwańska → replaced by  Aleksandra Krunić
  Lucie Šafářová → replaced by  Alison Van Uytvanck
  Laura Siegemund → replaced by  Zarina Diyas
  Serena Williams → replaced by  Wang Qiang

WTA doubles main-draw entrants

Seeds

Rankings are as of April 30, 2018.

Other entrants
The following pairs received wildcards into the doubles main draw:
  Sorana Cîrstea /  Sara Sorribes Tormo 
  Anabel Medina Garrigues /  Arantxa Parra Santonja
The following pairs received entry as alternates:
  Christina McHale /  Peng Shuai 
  Anastasia Pavlyuchenkova /  Olga Savchuk

Withdrawals
Before the tournament
  Kateryna Bondarenko (head injury)
  Elise Mertens (gastrointestinal illness)
  Jeļena Ostapenko (abdominal injury)

Champions

Men's singles
 
  Alexander Zverev def.  Dominic Thiem, 6–4, 6–4

Women's singles
 
  Petra Kvitová def.  Kiki Bertens, 7–6(8–6), 4–6, 6–3

Men's doubles
 
  Nikola Mektić /  Alexander Peya def.  Bob Bryan /  Mike Bryan, 5–3, ret.

Women's doubles
 
  Ekaterina Makarova /  Elena Vesnina def.  Tímea Babos /  Kristina Mladenovic, 2–6, 6–4, [10–8]

References

External links
 Official website